The Northeast Neighborhood Library is a branch of the District of Columbia Public Library in the Capitol Hill neighborhood of Washington, D.C. It is located at 330 7th Street NE. The Georgian Revival-style brick building first opened in 1932 and it reopened in 2014 following a $10 million renovation that preserved its historic interior.

References

External links 
 

Public libraries in Washington, D.C.
Capitol Hill
Georgian Revival architecture in Washington, D.C.
Library buildings completed in 1932
1932 establishments in Washington, D.C.